Shrimaan Shrimati Phir Se is an Indian Sitcom which premiered on 13 March 2018 on SAB TV. This series is a reboot of Shrimaan Shrimati  which was broadcast on DD National.

Premise 
Two neighbors constantly try to impress each other's wives.

Cast

Main 
 Sameer Shah/Prasad Barve as Keshav Kulkarni
 Sucheta Khanna as Kokila Kulkarni
 Suresh Menon as Dilruba Jarnail Singh Khurana
 Barkha Sengupta as Prema Shalini

Recurring 
 Shivlekh Singh as Chintu, Keshav and Kokila's son
 Jalak Motiwala as Gokhale, Keshav's friend
 Hitesh Dave as Mr. Bablu Prasad Sharma, Keshav and Gokhale's boss
 Divya Bhatnagar as Pinky, Kokila's good friend
 Shyn Khurana as Sonia
 Shyam Mashalkar as Toto, the Director of Prema's film 
 Abraam Pandey as Parminder, superstar and Prema's co-actor
 Rinku Singh Nikumbh as Mrs. Pandey, a woman who works in Keshav's office
 Meiron Damania as Mr. Bombaywala, A man who works in Keshav's office
 Rishima Sidhu as Vijay Laxmi, A women who works in Keshav's Office.

Episodes

Shrimaan Shrimati Phir Se

See also
 List of Hindi comedy shows

References

External links

2018 Indian television series debuts
Hindi comedy shows
Sony SAB original programming
Indian comedy television series
Indian television sitcoms
Television series reboots
2018 Indian television series endings